The 2016 Big East men's basketball tournament, officially known as the 2016 Big East tournament, was a tournament held from March 9–12, at Madison Square Garden in New York City. The Big East Championship game returned to broadcast television for the first time in over twenty years and was televised on FOX. Seton Hall won their first Big East tournament since 1993 and received the conference's automatic bid to the NCAA tournament.

Seeds
All 10 Big East schools participate in the tournament. Teams were seeded by the 2015–16 Big East Conference season record. The top 6 teams received a first round bye.

Seeding for the tournament was determined at the close of the regular conference season.

Schedule

Bracket

Quarterfinals

Semifinals

Championship

All-Tournament team

Khadeen Carrington, Seton Hall
Ismael Sanogo, Seton Hall
Kris Jenkins, Villanova
Josh Hart, Villanova
Trevon Bluiett, Xavier

Dave Gavitt Trophy (Most Outstanding Player)
Isaiah Whitehead, Seton Hall

See also
2016 Big East women's basketball tournament

Notes

References

Tournament
Big East men's basketball tournament
College sports tournaments in New York City
Basketball competitions in New York City
Sports in Manhattan
Big East men's basketball tournament
Big East men's basketball tournament
2010s in Manhattan